Looking for Love or Lookin' for Love may refer to:

Music
 "Looking for Love" (Karen Carpenter song) (1966)
 "Lookin' for Love" (Diesel song) (1989)
"Lookin' for Love", a 1980 song by Johnny Lee
 "Looking for Love" (Karen Ramirez song)
 "Looking for Love" (September song) (2007)
 "Looking for Love", a song by the Cars from Heartbeat City
 "Looking for Love", a song by Ratt from Dancing Undercover
 "Looking for Love", a song by Whitesnake from the European release of Whitesnake

Other uses
 Looking for Love (film), a 1964 musical film starring Connie Francis

See also
"Lookin' for a Love", a song written by J.W. Alexander and Zelda Samuels, covered by Bobby Womack in 1974
"Lookin' for a Love", a 1975 song by Neil Young from Zuma
"Looking for a New Love", a 1987 song by Jody Watley